For the 2003 Vuelta a España, the field consisted of 198 riders; 159 finished the race.

By rider

By nationality

References

2003 Vuelta a España
2003